Richard Pefferle (January 5, 1905 – March 7, 1969) was an American set decorator. He was nominated for six Academy Awards in the category Best Art Direction.

Selected filmography
Pefferle was nominated for six Academy Awards for Best Art Direction:
 Kismet (1944)
 Madame Bovary (1949)
 Annie Get Your Gun (1950)
 Les Girls (1957)
 The Wonderful World of the Brothers Grimm (1962)
 Period of Adjustment (1962)

References

External links
 
 

1905 births
1969 deaths
American set decorators
People from Sidney, Ohio